Philip Sydney Fisher,  (March 31, 1896 – December 17, 1983) was a Canadian businessman. He was president of the Southam Company Ltd. (later Southam Inc.) from 1945 to 1961 and chairman from 1961.

During the First World War, Fisher served as a pilot with the Royal Naval Air Service, flying submarine patrols and then fighter missions. He shot down at least three German airplanes before being wounded in 1917. He achieved the rank of captain.

He was the nephew of Sydney Fisher.

References 

1896 births
1983 deaths
Businesspeople from Montreal
20th-century Canadian businesspeople
Anglophone Quebec people
Canadian newspaper executives
Officers of the Order of Canada
Canadian Commanders of the Order of the British Empire
Canadian Companions of the Distinguished Service Order
Canadian recipients of the Distinguished Service Cross (United Kingdom)
Royal Naval Air Service aviators
McGill University alumni